The Thoroughbred is a 1928 British silent drama film directed by Sidney Morgan and starring Ian Hunter, Louise Prussing and Richard Barclay. It was made at Twickenham Studios. The screenplay concerns a jockey who is pressured to throw The Derby.

Premise
The wife of a Member of Parliament pressures a jockey to throw The Derby.

Cast
 Ian Hunter   
 Louise Prussing   
 Richard Barclay   
 Harry Agar Lyons

References

Bibliography
 Low, Rachel. The History of British Film: Volume IV, 1918–1929. Routledge, 1997.
 Wood, Linda. British Films, 1927-1939. British Film Institute, 1986.

External links

1928 films
British sports drama films
British silent feature films
1920s sports drama films
Films directed by Sidney Morgan
Films shot at Twickenham Film Studios
Films set in England
Films set in London
British horse racing films
British black-and-white films
1928 drama films
1920s English-language films
1920s British films
Silent sports drama films